The 2016 Sacramento mayoral election was held on June 7, 2016 to elect the mayor of Sacramento, California. It saw the election of Darrell Steinberg. Since Steinberg won a majority in the first round, no runoff was required.

Municipal elections in California are officially non-partisan.

Results 
In the June 7, 2016 elections, voter turnout in Sacramento County, in which Sacramento is located, was 47.54%. Coinciding elections included the California presidential primaries.

References 

Sacramento
Mayoral elections in Sacramento, California
Sacramento